Curb Your Dogma is the third studio album by Spongehead, released on October 19, 1993 by Triple X Records.

Track listing

Personnel 
Adapted from the Curb Your Dogma liner notes.

Spongehead
David Henderson – bass saxophone, photography
Doug Henderson – guitar, bass guitar, vocals, production
Mark Kirby – drums, vocals

Production and additional personnel
Ed Funk – photography
John Nowlin – cover art, design, bass guitar (9)
Dave Sardy – production, recording, mixing

Release history

References 

1993 albums
Spongehead albums
Albums produced by Doug Henderson (musician)
Albums produced by Dave Sardy
Triple X Records albums